Kampos may refer to:
Kampos (Thrace), a town of ancient Thrace, near Constantinople
Kampos, Cyprus, a village in Nicosia District
Kampos, Elis, a village in Elis 
Kampos, Karditsa, a municipal unit in the Karditsa regional unit
Kampos, Messenia, a village in Messenia 
Kampos, Tinos, a village on the island of Tinos, Cyclades
Kampos, Ikaria, a village on the Ikaria island, Southern Sporades